A category of fine art, graphic art covers a broad range of visual artistic expression, typically two-dimensional, i.e. produced on a flat surface. The term usually refers to the arts that rely more on line, color or tone, especially drawing and the various forms of engraving; it is sometimes understood to refer specifically to printmaking processes, such as line engraving, aquatint, drypoint, etching, mezzotint, monotype, lithography, and screen printing (silk-screen, serigraphy). Graphic art mostly includes calligraphy, photography, painting, typography, computer graphics, and bindery. It also encompasses drawn plans and layouts for interior and architectural designs.

History
Throughout history, technological inventions have shaped the development of graphic art. In 2500 BC, the Egyptians used graphic symbols to communicate their thoughts in a written form known as hieroglyphics. The Egyptians wrote and illustrated narratives on rolls of papyrus to share the stories and art with others.

During the Middle Ages, scribes manually copied each individual page of manuscripts to maintain their sacred teachings. The scribes would leave marked sections of the page available for artists to insert drawings and decorations. Using art alongside the carefully lettered text enhanced the religious reading experience.

In 1450, Johannes Gutenberg created the first upgraded moving type mechanical equipment called as the printing press. His printing press aided the mass creation of text and visual art, eventually obviating the need for hand transcriptions.

Again during the Renaissance years, graphic art in the form of printing played a major role in the spread of classical learning in Europe. Within these manuscripts, book designers focused heavily on typeface.

Due to the development of larger fonts during the Industrial Revolution, posters became a popular form of graphic art used to communicate the latest information as well as to advertise the latest products and services.

The invention and popularity of film and television changed graphic art through the additional aspect of motion as advertising agencies attempted to use kinetics to their advantage.

The next major change in graphic arts came when the personal computer was invented in the twentieth century. Powerful computer software enables artists to manipulate images in a much faster and simpler way than the skills of board artists prior to the 1990s. With quick calculations, computers easily recolor, scale, rotate, and rearrange images if the programs are known.

The design of street signs has been impacted by scientific examinations into readability. New York City is in the midst of replacing all of its street signs that have all capital characters with ones that only have upper and lower case letters. They anticipate that greater readability will improve wayfinding and greatly reduce collisions and injuries.

Graphic design software 

Graphic artists applying for positions in today's job market are expected to be familiar with computers and a variety of software programs to create the most appealing, up to date artworks.

Graphic art software includes applications such as:
Adobe Dreamweaver – a tool that facilitates the creation of webpages and dynamic internet content
Adobe Illustrator – a software application that allows artists to manipulate vector graphics
Adobe InDesign – desktop publishing software used for layout and design manipulation
Adobe Photoshop – a bitmap graphics software including powerful graphics editing tools that provide a large variety of editing functionality
CorelDRAW – similar to Adobe Illustrator, it is another vector graphic manipulation tool
PhotoImpact – a digital photograph editor
QuarkXPress – similar to Adobe InDesign, it is another computer publishing software tool
Affinity Photo - an alternative to Adobe Photoshop
Affinity Designer - an alternative to Adobe Illustrator

Free software
Paint.net – photograph editing capabilities with many plugins to expand use
GIMP – similar to paint.net and Photoshop
Inkscape – similar to Illustrator

Beside computers and software, graphic artists are also expected to be creative with processing camera work, registration, crop marks, and masking.

Careers 

One of the most common career paths for a graphic artist today is web design. With the popularity of the World Wide Web, the demand for web designers is immense. Graphic artists use their creativity with layouts, typography, and logos to market the products or services of the client's business. In addition to creating graphical designs, graphic artists also need to understand hypertext, web programming, and web page maintenance to successfully create a web page. The responsibility for effective communication also falls under the auspices of the graphic designer.

See also
Communication design
Crowdsourcing creative work
Digital art
Painting
Illustration
Caricature
Cartoon
 Comic
Animation
Graphic design
Printmaking
Visual arts

References

Communication design
Graphic design
Visual arts